Vikramgadh taluka is a taluka in Palghar district of Maharashtra an Indian state.

On 1 August 2014,  the talukas of Mokhada, Jawahar, Talasari, Vikramgadh, Wada, Dahanu, Palghar and Vasai were separated from the erstwhile Thane district to form a new district Palghar.

References

Talukas in Maharashtra
Talukas in Palghar district